Jake Funk (born January 11, 1998) is an American football running back for the Indianapolis Colts of the National Football League (NFL). He played college football at Maryland. In Maryland's four games during the COVID-19-shortened 2020 season, Funk averaged 129 rushing yards per game. He also led the Big Ten Conference and ranked second among all Football Bowl Subdivision running backs with an average of 8.6 rushing yards per carry. Funk was drafted in the 7th round of the 2021 NFL Draft NFL Draft by the Los Angeles Rams, and won a Super Bowl with the team in 2022.

High school career 
Funk attended Damascus High School, where he was a heavily lauded football player. Funk was named the 2015 Maryland Gatorade Player of the Year as well as The Washington Post All-Metro Offensive Player of the Year for the same year, also earning two consensus all-state selections. In the state championship game his senior year, Funk scored a title-game record seven rushing touchdowns against Dundalk High School. Funk finished his senior season as the Maryland state record holder for touchdowns in a season with 57.

Recruiting profile 
Despite his success in high school, Funk was only a moderately-rated prospect, earning two-star ratings from ESPN and Rivals.com and three-star ratings from 247Sports.com and Scout.com. Despite this, he received scholarship offers from the three service academies (Army, Navy, and Air Force) Ivy League schools Harvard, Yale, and Penn, Group of Five schools Ohio, Old Dominion, and Charlotte, Football Championship Subdivision schools Towson and Bucknell, and Big Ten schools Wisconsin and his eventual destination Maryland. Though recruiters were concerned about Funk's speed, his strength and versatility on defense made him an intriguing option (Funk also played safety in high school), and he was recruited by at least one school as a linebacker. However, after receiving his offer from Maryland, Funk quickly committed to his hometown school, where he was the first commit for then-interim head coach Mike Locksley.

College career

Freshman year 
Funk did not redshirt, and debuted in a 2016 game against Howard University where he rushed for 59 yards and a touchdown. He caught his first career touchdown pass that year against Purdue. He ended the season with 29 carries for 136 yards and one touchdown (averaging 4.7 yards a carry), and seven receptions for 42 yards and one touchdown.

Sophomore year 
Funk appeared in all 12 of Maryland's games during his sophomore season and ended the year with 27 carries for 145 yards (averaging 5.4 yards a carry) and four touchdowns, second-most on the team. He also caught one pass for four yards and a touchdown.

Junior year 
Funk had an injury-shortened junior season, playing through a wrist injury before tearing his ACL.

Redshirt junior year 
Due to his injury, Funk received an extra year of eligibility, and played in Maryland's first three games before tearing his ACL again in a game against Temple. Through the three games, Funk carried seventeen times for 173 yards and two touchdowns, and also caught four passes for 16 yards.

Redshirt senior year 
Funk had his best statistical season after returning from his consecutive ACL tears. Playing during for the COVID-19-shortened Big Ten season, he was the team's primary option at running back after the departure of Javon Leake and Anthony McFarland Jr. to the NFL.  Across Maryland's four games, Funk rushed 60 times for 519 yards, averaging 8.6 yards per carry, which ranked him first in the Big Ten and second among all Football Bowl Subdivision running backs in yards per carry. He averaged 129 rushing yards a game as well, ranking him second in the Big Ten and eighth among FBS backs. Funk scored three rushing touchdowns and one receiving touchdown, and was named third-team All-Big Ten. At the end of the season, Funk ranked third on Maryland's list of yards per carry across a single season.

Professional career 
Despite having two seasons of eligibility remaining due to injury and NCAA policy surrounding COVID-19 and a chance to return as a starting back for Maryland, Funk opted to enter the 2021 NFL Draft. Due to his perception as a primarily straight-line runner who was not particularly elusive, Sports Illustrated speculated that he would go undrafted, but could potentially find a role as a special teams player.

After Funk's performance at Maryland's pro day, draft analyst Mel Kiper mused that Funk could potentially be a late-round draft pick or an undrafted free agent: "I think he's going to fight his way onto a roster. He’s a competitive runner. He's a battler. He just puts his nose in there and he just fights and he's quick to the hole. He's shown home run-hitting ability where he can outrace the cornerback, safeties to the end zone, to the pay dirt. He'll catch the ball, he'll block. He's just a guy that gives you everything he has."

Los Angeles Rams
Funk was drafted in the seventh round (233rd overall) by the Los Angeles Rams. In post-draft interviews, Funk indicated that he "never gave up faith," and that he was looking forward to his likely role as a special teams player. On May 16, 2021, Funk signed his four-year rookie contract with the Rams.

On October 18, 2021, coach Sean McVay announced a day after a Week 6 win over the New York Giants that Funk had suffered a hamstring injury and was placed on injured reserve on October 18. He was activated on December 21. Funk won Super Bowl LVI when the Rams defeated the Cincinnati Bengals 23-20.

On October 11, 2022, Funk was waived by the Los Angeles Rams.

New Orleans Saints
On October 12, 2022, Funk was signed to the New Orleans Saints practice squad. He was released on November 8.

Indianapolis Colts
On November 10, 2022, Funk was signed to the Indianapolis Colts practice squad. He was promoted to the active roster on January 3, 2023.

Personal life 
Funk hails from a family of athletes. His father, Jim, was a football player for Penn State and his mother, A’Lisa, was a national title-winning swimmer at Clarion University of Pennsylvania. Two of Funk's grandparents were also athletes at Penn State, and his grandmother Jean was one of Penn State's first female athletes, competing for the men's rifle team. Funk has a brother, Jordan, who played one year of football for Army before transferring to James Madison. He also has a half-brother, who played lacrosse at Ohio State University and professionally for the Minnesota Swarm. His half-brother went on to earn a doctorate from the University of Maryland, Baltimore, he owns several physical therapy clinics in Montgomery County and assisted Funk in his ACL rehab.

Funk began dating  former The Bachelor winner Hannah Ann Sluss in November 2021. They announced their engagement on January 25, 2023.

References

External links
Indianapolis Colts bio
Maryland Terrapins bio

1998 births
Living people
People from Gaithersburg, Maryland
Sportspeople from Montgomery County, Maryland
Players of American football from Maryland
American football running backs
Maryland Terrapins football players
Los Angeles Rams players
New Orleans Saints players
Indianapolis Colts players